Akhtar Abdur Rahman Khan NI(M), HI(M), TI(M), SBt (Urdu: اختر عبد الرحمن‎; 11 June 1924 – 17 August 1988), was a Pakistani senior army general who served as the 5th Chairman Joint Chiefs of Staff Committee of the Pakistan Armed Forces from 1987 to 1988 and as also served as the 7th Director-General of Inter-Services Intelligence from 1979 to 1987. As DG ISI, General Akhtar collaborated with the Central Intelligence Agency and masterminded the resistance network of the Afghan Mujahideen against the Soviet Union, eventually managing to force the Soviets out of Afghanistan. Due to his close friendship with President of Pakistan General Zia-ul-Haq, General Akhtar was widely considered to be the second most powerful man in the country during General Zia's eleven-year military dictatorship. He died in the plane crash which also killed General Zia and the US Ambassador to Pakistan Arnold Lewis Raphel. After his death, his sons Humayun Akhtar Khan and Haroon Akhtar Khan joined politics and have been elected as Members of Parliament and headed key ministerial portfolios several times.

Education
Akhtar Abdur Rahman Khan was born on 11 June 1924 in Peshawar, North-West Frontier Province. into a Kakazai Pashtun family. Akhtar's father, Dr Abdul Rahman Khan was a doctor in a government hospital in Peshawar, North-West Frontier Province (present-day Khyber Pakhtunkhwa). He lost his father at the tender age of four and was raised by his mother, after the family moved to East Punjab in British India. He enrolled in Government College University (Faisalabad) in 1941, subsequently earning a Bachelor of Science in Statistics in 1945 followed by a Master of Science in Economics in 1947. He also was key in capturing the Indian fortress of Qaiser-e-Hind.

Military career

Rising through the ranks
General Akhtar Abdur Rahman joined the British Indian Army in 1946, before becoming Captain in Pakistan Army in 1949. After witnessing the traumatic events during the partition, Akhtar was appointed as an instructor at the Artillery School in Nowshera. Later, he was selected for an infantry training course with the British Army and was sent on deputation to complete a course in the United Kingdom. Upon returning to Pakistan,  he was promoted to the rank of major and posted as a military adviser to East-Pakistan Army from April 1954 to October 1954. He was later transferred back to General combatant headquarters (GHQ) as a staff officer, a position he held from April 1956 to February 1957. He actively participated in the Indo-Pakistani War of 1965 and was appointed at IV Corps as an operational field officer. In the 1965 war he gallantly defended the Lahore sector and that led to his promotion to lieutenant-colonel and he remained second-in-command of the infantry regiment in Lahore. After the war, he was promoted to the rank of colonel while being stationed with the IV Corps. Later, he was promoted to the rank of brigadier and transferred to northern parts of the country where he commanded an infantry brigade in Azad Kashmir.

In 1971, he was promoted to the two-star general rank of major-general and served as general Oofficer commanding (GOC) of the 12th Infantry Division stationed in Murree. as GOC of the 12th Infantry Division, General Akhtar was considered very close to Prime Minister Zulfiqar Ali Bhutto and personally received Bhutto whenever he visited the command office of the 12th Division. He did not take part in the 1977 military coup and privately opposed the martial law to remove Prime minister Zulfikar Ali Bhutto. Six months after the military coup of 1977 he was appointed as adjutant general at the General Headquarters for the next two years.  During this time, General Akhtar became aware of a conspiracy in which Lieutenant-General Faiz Ali Chishti of X Corps, a close associate of General Zia-ul-Haq, secretly became rebellious and conspired to stage a military coup in the country. As early as of 1979, Akhtar received a call from General Chishti and met him at his office in Chaklala Military District (CMD). At this meeting, General Chishti informed him of the conspiracy that aimed to topple General Zia-ul-Haq and sought his assistance. According to the News International's intelligence unit, Chishti was under the impression that since Rahman had not been promoted, he would accept this invitation; especially when he was promised that after the coup worked out successfully, he would not only be promoted but would also become one of the pillars of the new regime. After returning to the GHQ, General Akhtar contacted General Zia-ul-Haq and foiled the plot against Zia. In June 1979 after the counter-coup had been foiled, President General Zia-ul-Haq awarded General Akhtar a promotion to Lieutenant General and appointed him Director General of the ISI.

Soviet–Afghan War
When the Soviet Union deployed its 40th Army in Afghanistan, Pakistan's top military brass led by General Akhtar believed that Pakistan would be the Soviet Union's next target. They felt that because of Pakistan's strategic location and given the fact that it has warm water ports in the Arabian Sea, it was a prime target for future invasion. Considering the Soviet invasion of Afghanistan threatened Pakistan's national security, Pakistan's premier intelligence agency the ISI headed by General Akhtar started providing financial, military, and strategic assistance to the Afghan mujahideen. The ISI received billions of dollars in military assistance from the CIA and Saudi Arabia to train and command the Afghan rebels in a bid to defeat the Soviets. This covert operation was known as Operation Cyclone, and was executed with the CIA providing the money and weapons, the ISI training and commanding the Afghan Mujahideen groups, and the Mujahideen conducting guerrilla warfare, ultimately leading to the Soviet withdrawal from Afghanistan. During this time, General Akhtar developed a highly effective working relationship with key figures in the United States including CIA Director William Casey and Congressman Charlie Wilson.

During his tenure as DG ISI, General Akhtar's influence on Pakistan's atomic weapons program grew and he worked tirelessly to collect around him colleagues who were equally dynamic and determined to make the ISI an organisation that would influence the domestic and external policies of the country and it was under him that the ISI became recognized one of the most powerful spy agencies in the world. In 1987, at the pinnacle of his career after having achieved remarkable success as in the Afghan war and protecting Pakistan's Nuclear Program, General Akhtar was promoted to the four-star rank and appointed Chairman of the Joint Chiefs of Staff Committee, the highest ranking four-star assignment in the Pakistan Armed Forces.

Death
On 17 August 1988, General Akhtar died in a plane crash along with several other high-profile casualties including President of Pakistan General Zia-ul-Haq and US Ambassador to Pakistan Arnold Lewis Raphel. General Akhtar had accompanied General Zia to Bahawalpur in his C-130B Hercules Presidential aircraft to witness a US M1 Abrams tank demonstration. After the Generals witnessed the demonstration, the aircraft departed from Bahawalpur Airport and was expected to reach Islamabad International Airport.[110] Shortly after a smooth takeoff, the control tower lost contact with the aircraft. Witnesses who saw the plane in the air claimed it was flying erratically and then nosedived and exploded on impact, killing all 31 passengers on board. Shortly after the plane crash, the Senate chairman Ghulam Ishaq Khan became president and announced Zia's death on radio and TV. [113] There is speculation that various state intelligence agencies including the American CIA, Soviet KGB, Indian RAW, Israeli MOSSAD, and Afghan KHAD (in retaliation for Pakistani support of the mujahideen in Afghanistan) or an alliance of the four countries intelligence agencies along with dissident groups within the Pakistan Army were involved in the incident.

Shortly after the crash, a board of inquiry was set up to investigate it. It concluded 'the most probable cause of the crash was a criminal act of sabotage perpetrated in the aircraft'. It also suggested that poisonous gases were released which incapacitated the passengers and crew, which would explain why no Mayday signal was given.[116] There was also speculation into other facts involving the details of the investigation. A flight recorder (black box) was not located after the crash and previous C-130 aircraft did have them installed. To this day, the cause of the plane crash remains a mystery and has given rise to many conspiracy theories.

Corruption Charges
In one of The New York Times investigations, General Akhtar Abdur Rahman Khan, as the head of Pakistani intelligence agency, helped funnel billions of dollars in cash and other aid from the United States and other countries to the Mujahedeen in Afghanistan to support their fight against the Soviet Union. The same report mentioned that a Credit Suisse account was opened in 1985, in the name of three General Khan's sons. Years later, the account would grow to hold $3.7 million, the leaked records show. According to the paper, "Two of the general's sons, Akbar and Haroon Khan, did not respond to requests for comment from the reporting project. In a text message, a third son, Ghazi Khan, called information about the accounts "not correct," adding, "The content is conjectural." The claims remain unproven......

Awards and decorations

Books mentioning General Akhtar
 Fateh by Haroon-ur-Rasheed
 Silent soldier by Mohammad Yousaf
 The Bear Trap by Mohammad Yousaf and Mark Adkin
 Charlie Wilson's War by George Crile
 Ghost Wars by Steve Coll
 A Case of Exploding Mango's Mohammad Hanif
 Profiles of Intelligence by Brigadier Syed A. I. Tirmizi

See also

 History of the Soviet Union (1985–1991)

References

1924 births
1988 deaths
Pakistani generals
Recipients of Hilal-i-Jur'at
Directors General of Inter-Services Intelligence
Chairmen Joint Chiefs of Staff Committee
Pashtun people
Pakistani anti-communists
Military government of Pakistan (1977–1988)
Pakistani financiers
Corruption in Pakistan
People of the Soviet–Afghan War
Pakistani military personnel of the Indo-Pakistani War of 1971
Pakistan Army Artillery Corps officers
Victims of aviation accidents or incidents in 1988
Victims of aviation accidents or incidents in Pakistan